Leith Walk railway station was a railway station located on Leith Walk in Edinburgh. In order to build the station, the Gallow Lee, which was once the site of public executions, was excavated. The station opened on 22 March 1868 and was served by trains on Edinburgh local rail services. During World War I the station was closed as an economy measure between 1 January 1917 and 31 January 1919. The station closed to passengers on 31 March 1930. It is likely that this was due to competition from Edinburgh Corporation Tramways as the tram journey from the city centre to Leith Walk was quicker than travelling by train. Passenger trains continued to serve other stations on the line until 1947.

Parts of the station platforms still exist although they are overgrown with weeds. The station buildings on Leith Walk were demolished in the 1970s. The railway line through the station was used to carry waste from Powderhall Waste Transfer Station to a landfill site in East Lothian until 2016, when the plant closed.

References

Notes

External links

Disused railway stations in Edinburgh
Former North British Railway stations
Railway stations in Great Britain opened in 1868
Railway stations in Great Britain closed in 1917
Railway stations in Great Britain opened in 1919
Railway stations in Great Britain closed in 1930